Microtralia is a genus of minute air-breathing land snails, terrestrial gastropod mollusks to micromollusks in the family Ellobiidae, the salt marsh snails.

Species 
Species within the genus Microtralia include:

 Microtralia ovulum
 Microtralia insularis

References

 Nomenclator Zoologicus info

External links 
 http://www.malacolog.org/search.php?nameid=7733

Ellobiidae